Randjesfontein Agricultural Holdings is a rural settlement in Gauteng, South Africa. It is located in Midrand, Region A of the City of Johannesburg Metropolitan Municipality.

References

Johannesburg Region A